The 2015 UEFA European Under-21 Championship Final was a football match that took place on 30 June 2015 at the Eden Arena in Prague, Czech Republic, and determined the winner of the 2015 UEFA European Under-21 Championship. Sweden won their first title defeating Portugal 4–3 in the penalty shoot-out, after a goalless draw.

Route to the final

Match details

References

Final
UEFA European Under-21 Championship finals
Sweden national under-21 football team
Portugal national under-21 football team
European Under-21 Championship Final 2015
Sports competitions in Prague
2010s in Prague
Portugal–Sweden relations
June 2015 sports events in Europe